Katy M. O’Brian (born 1989) is an American actress, writer, and martial artist. She is best known for her roles as Jentorra in Ant-Man and the Wasp: Quantumania, George in Syfy’s zombie show Z Nation, Major Sarah Grey in The CW’s superhero series Black Lightning and Kimball in Marvel's Agents of S.H.I.E.L.D.. O'Brian plays Imperial communications officer Elia Kane in the second and third seasons of The Mandalorian.

Early life and education
O'Brian  was born in Indianapolis, Indiana. At the age of 9, O'Brian  earned her brown belt in Shorei Goju Ryu Karate. Throughout her youth, she participated in numerous sports programs and music programs as a percussionist.

O'Brian  attended Indiana University Bloomington, majoring in psychology and Germanic studies. She was one of the first members of the university's short-form improv troupe Hoosonfirst and received law enforcement certification through the university's Cadet Officer Program. While at the university, Katy received her black belt in Hapkido through the United States Hapkido Federation.

After graduation, O'Brian was a police officer at the Carmel Police Department in Carmel, Indiana. While working for the department, O'Brian obtained her personal trainer certification and began competing in bodybuilding figure competitions. She also began her training at the Indy Actor's Academy.

Personal life 
Shortly after moving to Los Angeles, O'Brian met her wife, Kylie Chi, on the set of a student film project. The couple live together in Los Angeles.

Career 
O'Brian's first television role was as a Savior named Katy on AMC’s The Walking Dead, quickly followed by co-star roles on Halt & Catch Fire, Tosh.O and How to Get Away with Murder.

In 2018, O'Brian booked her first series regular role on the series Z Nation where she played George, a budding leader of the apocalypse. In 2019, O'Brian appeared in the CW series Black Lightning as an ASA antagonist, Major Sarah Grey. She has since appeared in season 3 of HBO’s Westworld and has several upcoming projects.

Filmography

Film

Television

Self

References

External links 
 http://www.katyobrian.com
 

1989 births
Living people
American film actresses
American television actresses
American lesbian actresses
21st-century American actresses
American lesbian writers
Indiana University alumni
21st-century American women writers
American hapkido practitioners